David Solway (born 8 December 1941) is a Canadian poet, educational theorist, travel writer and literary critic.

He is a member of the Jubilate Circle and formerly a teacher of English Literature at John Abbott College. He has spent most of his life in the Montreal area and now lives in Hudson, Quebec.

Solway is known for his work both as a poet, essayist and as a teacher, as well as for his polemical outspokenness, especially in opposition to Islam and in defense of Zionism, George W. Bush and the  war on terror.  He has contributed political commentary to the conservative websites WorldNetDaily and PJ Media. He has been described as a part of the counter-jihad movement.

For inspiration, he invented a Greek poet named Andreas Karavis as a heteronym, whose work he published in apparent translation.

Bibliography

Poetry
 The Road to Arginos (1976)
 Twelve Sonnets (1978)
 Mephistopheles and the Astronaut (1979)
 Stones in Water (1983)
 Modern Marriage (1987)
 Bedrock (1993)
 Chess Pieces (1999)
 Saracen Island: The Poetry of Andreas Karavis (as Andreas Karavis; 2000)
 The Lover's Progress: Poems after William Hogarth (2001)
 Franklin's Passage (2003)
 The Pallikari Of Nesmine Rifat (as Nesmine Rifat; 2005)
 Reaching for Clear: The Poetry of Rhys Savarin (2007) (winner of the A. M. Klein Prize for Poetry)
 Windsurfing (2008)

Essays and criticism
 Education Lost (1989)
 Random Walks Lying about the Wolf: Essays in Culture & Education (1997)
 The Turtle Hypodermic of Sickenpods: Liberal Studies in the Corporate Age (2000)
 An Andreas Karavis Companion (2000)
 Director's Cut (2003)The Big Lie: On Terror, Antisemitism, and Identity (2007)
 Hear, O Israel! (2009)Notes from a Derelict Culture (2019)

See also

List of Canadian poets

References

 New, W. H., ed. The Encyclopedia of Literature in Canada. Toronto: University of Toronto Press, 2002. p. 1058.
 Carmine Starnino, ed. David Solway, Essays on His Works'' (2001)

1941 births
Living people
20th-century Canadian poets
Canadian male poets
Canadian literary critics
Canadian political writers
Canadian critics of Islam
Counter-jihad activists
20th-century Canadian male writers
Canadian male non-fiction writers
Jewish Canadian journalists